The women's discus throw at the 2014 European Athletics Championships took place at the Letzigrund on 15 and 16 August.

Medalists

Records

Schedule

Results

Qualification
57.50 (Q) or at least 12 best performers (q) advanced to the Final.

Final

References

Discus Throw W
Discus throw at the European Athletics Championships
2014 in women's athletics